Hansel Izquierdo (born January 2, 1977) is a retired Major League Baseball pitcher. He played during one season at the major league level for the Florida Marlins. He was drafted by the Marlins in the 7th round of the  amateur draft. Izquierdo played for the Tecolotes de Nuevo Laredo of the Mexican League in 2010.

Hansel is married to Annia Izquierdo and has four children, one from a previous relationship. He graduated from Southwest Miami High School. He currently resides in Miami, Florida, with his wife and three children.

See also

List of baseball players who defected from Cuba

Article "Scouts, entrenadores y consejeros: la nueva ola cubana en Grandes Ligas"
http://www.elnuevoherald.com/deportes/beisbol/article123836939.html

References

External links

1977 births
Living people
Edmonton Trappers players
Florida Marlins players
Major League Baseball pitchers
Major League Baseball players from Cuba
Cuban expatriate baseball players in the United States
Mayos de Navojoa players
Gulf Coast Marlins players
Bristol White Sox players
Gulf Coast White Sox players
Winston-Salem Warthogs players
Hickory Crawdads players
Birmingham Barons players
Kinston Indians players
Sonoma County Crushers players
Brevard County Manatees players
Kane County Cougars players
Portland Sea Dogs players
Calgary Cannons players
Pawtucket Red Sox players
Trenton Thunder players
Columbus Clippers players
Iowa Cubs players
Nashville Sounds players
Indianapolis Indians players
Altoona Curve players
Long Island Ducks players
Cuban expatriate baseball players in Mexico
Cuban expatriate baseball players in Taiwan
Cuban expatriate baseball players in Canada
Cafeteros de Córdoba players
Cuban expatriate baseball players in Puerto Rico
Lobos de Arecibo players
Olmecas de Tabasco players
Rieleros de Aguascalientes players
Rojos del Águila de Veracruz players
Tecolotes de Nuevo Laredo players
Uni-President Lions players